Salen refers to a tetradentate C2-symmetric ligand synthesized from salicylaldehyde (sal) and ethylenediamine (en). It may also refer to a class of compounds, which are structurally related to the classical salen ligand, primarily bis-Schiff bases. Salen ligands are notable for coordinating a wide range of different metals, which they can often stabilise in various oxidation states. For this reason salen-type compounds are used as metal deactivators. Metal salen complexes also find use as catalysts.

Synthesis and properties
H2salen may be synthesized by the condensation of ethylenediamine and salicylaldehyde.

Complexes of salen with metal cations may be made without isolating it from the reaction mixture. This is possible because the stability constant for the formation of the metal complexes are very high, due to the chelate effect.

H2L + Mn+ → ML(n−2)+ + 2 H+

where L stands for the ligand. The pyridine adduct of the cobalt(II) complex Co(salen)(py) (salcomine) has a square-pyramidal structure; it can act as a dioxygen carrier by forming a labile, octahedral O2 complex.

The name “salen ligands” is used for tetradentate ligands which have similar structures. For example, in salpn there is a methyl substituent on the bridge. It is used as a metal deactivation additive in fuels. The presence of bulky groups near the coordination site may enhance the catalytic activity of a metal complex and prevent its dimerization. Salen ligands derived from 3,5-di-tert-butylsalicylaldehyde fulfill these roles, and also increase the solubility of the complexes in non-polar solvents like pentane. Chiral “salen” ligands may be created by proper substitution of the diamine backbone, the phenyl ring, or both. An example is the ligand obtained by condensation of the C2-symmetric trans-1,2-diaminocyclohexane with 3,5-di-tert-butylsalicylaldehyde. Chiral ligands may be used in asymmetric synthesis reactions, such as the Jacobsen epoxidation:

Related ligands

A class of tetradentate ligands with the generic name acacen are obtained by the condensation of derivatives of acetylacetone and ethylenediamine. Cobalt complexes [Co(acacen)L2]+, selectively inhibit the activities of histidine-containing proteins through exchange of the axial ligands. These compounds show promise for the inhibition of oncogenesis.

The salan and salalen ligands are similar in structure to salen ligands, but have one or two saturated nitrogen-aryl bonds (amines rather than imines). They tend to be less rigid and more electron rich at the metal center than the corresponding salen complexes. Salans can be synthesized by the alkylation of an appropriate amine with a phenolic alkyl halide. The “half-salen” ligands have only one salicylimine group. They are prepared from a salicylaldehyde and a monoamine.

The name “salen” or “salen-type” may be used for other ligands that have similar environment around the chelating site, namely two acidic hydroxyls and two Schiff base (aryl-imine) groups. These include the ligands abbreviated as salph, from the condensation of 1,2-phenylenediamine and salicylaldehyde, and salqu, from the condensation of salicylaldehyde and 2-quinoxalinol.

See also
Metal salen complexes
Bisthiosemicarbazones, a structurally related class of C2-symmetric imine based ligands

References

Organometallic chemistry
Schiff bases
Tetradentate ligands